Thai Airways Flight 231 was a scheduled passenger flight that crashed on 27 April 1980. The Hawker Siddeley HS 748 operating the flight, registration HS-THB, stalled and crashed after entering a thunderstorm on approach to Bangkok. The accident killed 44 out of 53 passengers and crew on board.

Aircraft 
The aircraft was a Hawker-Siddeley HS 748 with registration HS-THB, built in 1964. The plane had completed 12,791 flight hours at the time of the accident.

Accident
The flight took off from Khon Kaen Airport for Don Mueang International Airport in Bangkok, Thailand. After about 40 minutes, Flight 231 was on approach to the airport, planning to land on runway 21R. It entered an area of rain, which turned out to be a severe thunderstorm, at 1500 feet. About a minute after entering the storm, a downdraft struck the plane, which caused the nose to go up and the plane to stall.

The aircraft then went into a nose dive, which the pilot tried to pull the aircraft out of. The Hawker then banked slightly to the right, and was almost out of the dive when it crashed into the ground. The plane then slid for 510 feet and broke up at 06:55. The accident killed 44 of the passengers and crew; the other 9 people aboard were injured.

Possible causes of the accident 
The following causes may have led to the crash:
 The weather radar on board was not used.
 There was no change in the frequency ATIS Special Weather Report. The crew therefore received no information about the storm.
 The pilots believed that flying with radar vectors was safe and that air traffic control would not direct the aircraft into a storm.
 The pilots did not realize that there was a second storm in the approach beyond the one they observed.

References 

Aviation accidents and incidents in 1980
Aviation accidents and incidents in Thailand
Airliner accidents and incidents caused by weather
Accidents and incidents involving the Hawker Siddeley HS 748
Thai Airways Company accidents and incidents
1980 in Thailand
1980 meteorology
April 1980 events in Thailand